Nicotiana is a genus of herbaceous plants and shrubs in the family Solanaceae, that is indigenous to the Americas, Australia, Southwestern Africa and the South Pacific. Various Nicotiana species, commonly referred to as tobacco plants, are cultivated as ornamental garden plants. N. tabacum is grown worldwide for the cultivation of tobacco leaves used for manufacturing and producing tobacco products, including cigars, cigarillos, cigarettes, chewing tobacco, dipping tobacco, snuff, and snus.

Taxonomy

Species

The 79 known species include:

 
 Nicotiana acuminata (Graham) Hook. – manyflower tobacco
 Nicotiana africana Merxm.
 Nicotiana alata Link & Otto – jasmine tobacco, sweet tobacco, winged tobacco, Persian tobacco, tanbaku (in Persian)
 Nicotiana attenuata Torrey ex S. Watson – coyote tobacco
 Nicotiana benthamiana Domin – benth, benthi
 Nicotiana clevelandii A. Gray – Cleveland's tobacco
 Nicotiana glauca Graham – tree tobacco, Brazilian tree tobacco, shrub tobacco, wild tobacco, tobacco plant, tobacco bush, tobacco tree, mustard tree
 Nicotiana glutinosa L.
 Nicotiana langsdorffii Weinm. – Langsdorff's tobacco
 Nicotiana longiflora Cav. – longflower tobacco or long-flowered tobacco
 Nicotiana occidentalis H.-M. Wheeler – native tobacco
 Nicotiana obtusifolia M. Martens & Galeotti – desert tobacco, punche, "tabaquillo"
 Nicotiana otophora Griseb.
 Nicotiana plumbaginifolia Viv. – Tex-Mex tobacco
 Nicotiana quadrivalvis Pursh – Indian tobacco
 Nicotiana rustica L. – Aztec tobacco, strong tobacco, mapacho
 Nicotiana suaveolens Lehm. – Australian tobacco
 Nicotiana sylvestris Speg. & Comes – woodland tobacco, flowering tobacco, South American tobacco
 Nicotiana tabacum L. – common tobacco, domesticated tobacco, cultivated tobacco, commercial tobacco (grown for the production of cigars, cigarillos, cigarettes, chewing tobacco, dipping tobacco, snuff, snus, etc.)
 Nicotiana tomentosiformis Goodsp.

Manmade hybrids
 Nicotiana × didepta – N. debneyi × N. tabacum
 Nicotiana × digluta – N. glutinosa × N. tabacum
 Nicotiana × sanderae Hort. ex Wats. – N. alata × N. forgetiana

Formerly placed here
 Petunia axillaris (Lam.) Britton et al. (as N. axillaris Lam.) – large white petunia, wild white petunia, white moon petunia

Etymology
The genus Nicotiana (from which the word nicotine is derived) was named in honor of Jean Nicot, French ambassador to Portugal, who in 1559 sent samples as a medicine to the court of Catherine de' Medici.

Ecology

Despite containing enough nicotine and/or other compounds such as germacrene and anabasine and other piperidine alkaloids (varying between species) to deter most herbivores, a number of such animals have evolved the ability to feed on Nicotiana species without being harmed. Nonetheless, tobacco is unpalatable to many species and therefore some tobacco plants (chiefly tree tobacco (N. glauca)) have become established as invasive species in some places.

In the 19th century, young tobacco plantings came under increasing attack from flea beetles (the potato flea bettle (Epitrix cucumeris) and/or Epitrix pubescens), causing the destruction of half the United States tobacco crop in 1876. In the years afterward, many experiments were attempted and discussed to control the potato flea beetle. By 1880, it was discovered that covering young plants with a frame covered with thin fabric (instead of with branches, as had previously been used for frost control) would effectively protect the plants from the beetle. This practice spread until it became ubiquitous in the 1890s.

Tobacco, alongside its related products, can be infested by parasites such as the tobacco beetle (Lasioderma serricorne) and the tobacco moth (Ephestia elutella), which are the most widespread and damaging pests in the tobacco industry. Infestation can range from the tobacco cultivated in the fields to the leaves used for manufacturing cigars, cigarillos, cigarettes, chewing tobacco, dipping tobacco, etc. Both the grubs of Lasioderma serricorne and the caterpillars of Ephestia elutella are considered major pests.

Other moths whose caterpillars feed on Nicotiana include:
 Black cutworm, greasy cutworm, or floodplain cutworm (as a caterpillar), dark sword-grass or ipsilon dart (as a moth) (Agrotis ipsilon)
 Turnip moth (Agrotis segetum)
 Mouse moth (Amphipyra tragopoginis)
 Clover cutworm (as a caterpillar), nutmeg (as a moth) (Hadula trifolii or Anarta trifolii)
 Endoclita excrescens
 Hawaiian tobacco hornworm or Hawaiian tomato hornworm (as a caterpillar), Blackburn's sphinx moth (as a moth) (Manduca blackburni)
 Tobacco hornworm or Goliath worm (as a caterpillar), tobacco hawkmoth or Carolina sphinx moth (as a moth) (Manduca sexta)
 Tomato hornworm (as a caterpillar), five-spotted hawkmoth (as a moth) (Manduca quinquemaculata)
 Cabbage moth (Mamestra brassicae)
 Angle shades (Phlogophora meticulosa)
 Setaceous Hebrew character (Xestia c-nigrum)
 Cabbage looper (Trichoplusia ni)
 Fall armyworm (Spodoptera frugiperda)
 Tobacco spitworm (as a caterpillar), potato tuber moth (as a moth) (Phthorimaea operculella)
 South American tomato pinworm, tomato pinworm or tomato leafminer (as a caterpillar), South American tomato moth (as a moth) (Tuta absoluta)
 Eggplant leafroller moth or nightshade leaftier (Lineodes integra)
 Eggplant webworm moth (Rhectocraspeda periusalis)

These are mainly Noctuidae, but they also comprise Sphingidae, Gelechiidae, and Crambidae.

Cultivation
Several species of Nicotiana, such as N. sylvestris, N. alata 'Lime Green' and N. langsdorffii are grown as ornamental plants, often under the name of flowering tobacco. They are popular vespertines (evening bloomers); their sweet-smelling flowers opening in the evening to be visited by hawkmoths and other pollinators. In temperate climates, they behave as annuals (hardiness 9a-11).
The hybrid cultivar 'Lime Green' has gained the Royal Horticultural Society's Award of Garden Merit.

Garden varieties are derived from N. alata (e.g., the 'Niki' and 'Saratoga' series) and more recently from Nicotiana × sanderae (e.g., the 'Perfume' and 'Domino' series).

The tobacco budworm (Chloridea virescens) has proved to be a massive “pest” of many species in the genus, and has resisted many attempts at management.

References

Bibliography

  (1999): Nicotiana. Retrieved 2007-11-20.

External links
The Plant List

 
Entheogens
Solanaceae genera
Tobacco

de:Tabak
nv:Nátʼoh (chʼil)